Carex atroviridis is a species of flowering plant in the family Cyperaceae. It was first formally named in 1931 by Jisaburo Ohwi. Carex atroviridis is endemic to Japan.

References

atroviridis
Plants described in 1931
Flora of Japan